The 1922 SMU Mustangs football team represented Southern Methodist University (SMU) as a member of the Southwest Conference (SWC) during the 1922 college football season. Led by co-head coaches Ray Morrison and Ewing Y. Freeland, the Mustangs compiled and overall record of 6–3–1 with a mark of 2–2 in conference play, tying for third in the SWC.

Schedule

References

SMU
SMU Mustangs football seasons
SMU Mustangs football